= David Bathurst =

British auction house chairman

David Bathurst (15 December 1937 – 20 September 1992) was the chairman of the auction house Christie Manson & Woods.
